The President of the Cricket Association of Bengal is the highest post at the Cricket Association of Bengal (CAB). Snehasish Ganguly is the current president of CAB.

List

See also
 Cricket Association of Bengal
 Bengal cricket team
 List of International Cricket Council presidents
 List of Board of Control for Cricket in India presidents

References

External links
 Former CAB Presidents cricketassociationofbengal.com

 

 
Indian sports executives and administrators
Indian cricket lists